The World Grand Prix is a professional ranking snooker tournament restricted to the top 32 players on the one-year ranking list. The inaugural edition was played in 2015 at the Venue Cymru in Llandudno, Wales. The reigning champion is Mark Allen.

History
The World Grand Prix was held as a non-ranking event in March 2015 in Llandudno, Wales, for the top 32 players on the World Grand Prix list. The list was based on a one-year ranking system.

From 2016, the World Grand Prix has been held as a ranking event.

In 2019, the tournament was included in the newly created Coral Cup series, and branded as "Coral World Grand Prix". The sponsor changed to Cazoo in 2021. In 2023, the sponsor changed to Duelbits.

Winners

References

 

Snooker ranking tournaments
Snooker competitions in the United Kingdom
Recurring sporting events established in 2015
2015 establishments in Wales